Communists of Catalonia is a communist party in Catalonia founded in 2014.

Communists of Catalonia was founded on November 1, 2014, through the merger of the Party of the Communists of Catalonia (PCC), the Living Unified Socialist Party of Catalonia (PSUC-Viu) and independent communist sympathizers. Joan Josep Nuet was elected as Secretary General of the new organization. Like the founding parties, the new party participates in the coalition Esquerra Unida i Alternativa.

References

External links
  

 
2014 establishments in Catalonia
Communist parties in Catalonia
Political parties established in 2014
International Meeting of Communist and Workers Parties